The Fire and Rescue Department of Malaysia (Jawi: جابتن بومبا دان ڤڽلامت مليسيا), commonly known as Bomba, is a federal agency of Malaysia responsible for firefighting and technical rescue. Bomba is a Malay word derived from the Portuguese bombeiros which means 'firefighters'.

History 
Firefighting services in Malaysia began in 1883 with the establishment of the Selangor fire and rescue volunteers led by H.F. Bellamy, with 15 active personnel. The Malayan Union Fire Services (MUS), based in Kuala Lumpur, was established after World War II, headed by Flight Lt. W.J. German.

The firefighting services became the responsibility of state governments after the Malaysia Federation Agreement. The services were then integrated as a federal-level department on 1 January 1976, reporting to the Ministry of Housing and Local Government. The department received a new name on 15 May 1981: "The Malaysian Fire Services Department".

On 8 January 1997, the Malaysian Ministerial Cabinet agreed to change the coat of arms, flag, and name of the Malaysian Fire Services Department to the Malaysian Fire and Rescue Department. These were officially launched in a ceremony at the Genting Highlands Fire and Rescue Station in Pahang on 21 February 1997, by Prime Minister of Malaysia Mahathir Mohamad.

Insignia

Flag 
The JBPM flag is divided into 2 sections: a red triangle with the department crest and the lower triangle, with 15 alternating golden yellow and blue stripes.

Red 
Red symbolizes courage that is shown by firefighters in the line of duty during fire and rescue operations.

Yellow & blue stripes 
The 15 yellow and blue stripes represent the fifteen state-level fire and rescue departments throughout Malaysia.

Yellow 
The colour yellow symbolizes the department's high level of commitment to the public and stakeholders in the direction of a world-class firefighting service and also their loyalty to King and country.

Blue 
The colour blue reflects the importance of water which is used as the department's main medium of extinguishing fires and emphasizes safeguarding the environment while carrying out emergency operations.

Crest

Crescent and Star 
The Crescent and Star signifies Islam as the guiding principle of the department.

Firefighter helmet and crossed axes 
The helmet and crossed axes symbolize the importance of safety to every firefighter serving in the department.

Paddy Flower 
The semi-circular grains of the Paddy flower symbolize the nine State Monarchy as well as the department's ability to carry out its duties in accordance with the Fire Services Act 1988.

Clove hitch 
The Clove hitch represents the department's expertise in carrying out rescue work.

Red and Yellow 
The colour red symbolizes courage, while yellow symbolizes the department's high level of commitment to the public and stakeholders in the direction of a world-class firefighting service and also their loyalty to King and country.

JBPM pledge 
Section 5(1) & (2) Fire Services Act 1988 (Act 341) stipulates that the duties of the Malaysian Fire and Rescue Department firefighter are as follows:

 Extinguishing, fighting, preventing, and controlling fires.
 Protect life and property in case of fire.
 Determining fire exits, maintenance, and regulation.
 Carry out investigations into the cause, origin, and circumstances of a fire.
 Perform humanitarian services, including protection of life and property during the occurrence of any disaster.

JBPM firefighters can be called upon to perform duties beyond their duties under subsection (1), perform any other tasks entrusted to it by law, or otherwise called upon by the minister to be carried out.

Organizational structure

Federal Level

State Branch Director

Fire and Rescue Academy 
There are five Fire and Rescue Academy of Malaysia (FRAM) campuses which includes:
 FRAM Central Region, Kuala Kubu Bharu, Selangor.
 FRAM Eastern Region, Wakaf Tapai, Marang, Terengganu.
 FRAM Northern Region, Tronoh, Perak.
 FRAM Sabah Region, Kota Kinabalu, Sabah.
 FRAM Sarawak Region, Kuching, Sarawak.

FRAM offers certificate and diploma level courses in fire and rescue.

FRAM has a Band Unit that is attached to FRAM Central Region.

Auxiliary Fire Service & Volunteer Firefighting Teams 
On 4 May 2014, the Malaysian Government re-established the Auxiliary Fire Service in conjunction with the International Firefighters' Day celebrations at Merdeka Square, Kuala Lumpur. The re-establishment was officiated by the then Deputy Prime Minister, Tan Sri Muhyidin Yassin. Historically, the Auxiliary Fire Service was first formed in 1940. Then, after World War II, they were absorbed into the regular fire services.

There are some differences between Auxiliaries and Volunteers. Auxiliary Firefighters are formally trained at FRAM, while the Volunteer Firefighters receive their training at state and district fire stations. Auxiliary Firefighters are governed by the Fire Services Act 1988 and receive an allowance from the government. Volunteer Firefighters do not receive allowances from the government but are citizen volunteers serving as part of Volunteer Firefighting Teams based at Volunteer Fire Stations paid for by their local community. They are covered through insurance paid for by the Malaysian Government. Previously registered and governed by the Registrar of Societies, Volunteer Firefighters will now be registered and governed directly by the Malaysian Fire and Rescue Department after Parliament passed the Fire Services (Amendment) Act 2018.

Mountain Search and Rescue 
After the Sabah earthquake that happened on 5 June 2015 affected Ranau and Mount Kinabalu, a specialist Mountain Search and Rescue team (MOSAR) was formed out of the Kinabalu Mountain Guides of Sabah Parks on 23 June 2015. In a ceremony at Ranau Fire Station, 20 Kinabalu Mountain Guides were appointed as Auxiliary Firefighters and designated as the founding members of MOSAR. The ceremony was officiated by the then Minister of Urban Wellbeing, Housing and Local Government, Datuk Abdul Rahman Dahlan.

MOSAR takes its place among Malaysian Fire and Rescue Department's specialist rescue units, which includes the Special Tactical Operation and Rescue Team of Malaysia (STORM) and the Multi Skill Team (MUST).

Volunteer Fire and Rescue Force 
Volunteer Fire and Rescue Force traces their history back to 1883. The modern Volunteer Fire and Rescue Force was formed in 1987 and protected under Section 62 (1) (CA) Fire and Rescue Services Act 1988. Each Volunteer Fire and Rescue Force has their own fire stations, fire trucks, and equipment, which are usually sponsored by local industry.

The primary role of the Volunteer Fire and Rescue Force is to perform firefighting operations in their community. In case of fire emergencies in their community, the volunteers are the first there to control if not extinguish the fire. Their secondary role is to be the link between JBPM and their local community. In addition, they are entrusted by JBPM to spread awareness regarding to fire safety.

The Volunteer Fire and Rescue Force train regularly in district fire stations so that they and their equipment are in good shape for fire emergencies. The volunteers can be easily identified by their yellow Firefighting Operations Dress.

Uniform

Blue Working Dress 
JBPM start using 'Very Dark Corn Flower Blue' for their official duty uniform since 1997. Before that, JBPM personnel wore a Khaki-coloured working uniform.

The blue bush jacket uniform is worn by all JBPM ranks during official duties, while the tuck-in blue uniform version is worn during the parades.

Orange Camouflage Dress 
This dress is devoted to carrying out special tasks, rescue operations, and other operations that do not involve firefighting. This dress can also be worn when doing the daily work at the fire station or in the official parade.

Red Beret 
Both JBPM personnel and Auxiliary Firefighters are awarded with a red beret with a black lining behind the insignia once they finish their basic fire and rescue training at FRAM.

For Volunteer Fire and Rescue Force, headwear differs depending to the state. In Kedah, the volunteers wear a maroon beret with a red lining behind the JBPM insignia, whilst in Penang, they wear a red beret similar to the regular force but without the black lining. Firefighter Cadets wear a dark navy-blue beret instead.

Firefighting Operations Dress 
This fire-retardant dress is worn during firefighting operations and exercises that involve fire. This dress can also be worn during the official parade if instructed.

There are a few colors of the firefighting operations dress. The color red (which replacing orange) is worn by regular firefighters, yellow is worn by volunteer firefighters and black is worn by JBPM officers (ranking from Assistant Fire Superintendent to Chief Fire Commissioner).

Helmet 
JBPM currently uses the Dräger HPS 7000 as their standard issued fire and rescue helmet. JBPM currently uses 3 colors to mark a firefighter's rank,

White 
Used by all standard firefighting personnel.

Orange 
Used by officers and superintendents.

Red 
Used by commissioners.

USAR Helmet 
JBPM has chosen the Dräger HPS 3100 as their standard urban search and rescue helmet (Primarily used by STORM). The helmet is standardly issued to STORM but also USAR qualified firefighters from other specialist units including MUST and K9 unit (Obtained through the STORM Urban Search and Rescue training).

Rank 

List of ranks

Special Operations 
Pasukan Khas Jabatan Bomba dan Penyelamat Malaysia is a term used by JBPM to its special trained firefighters.

To differentiate with regular firefighters, Special Force firefighters wear a unit patch on the right shoulder and use different styles of camouflage and operations uniform.

MUST Team, Smoke Jumpers (PASKUB), and STORM can be sent to overseas to help handling any disaster with STORM being the primary unit being sent.

Special Forces

HAZMAT Unit Team 
Formed on 29 October 1992 after the Bright Sparklers Fireworks disaster incident, Hazardous Material Unit Team or commonly known as "HAZMAT" is a JBPM's Special Force trusted to handle with five types of hazards which is:
 Handling hazardous chemical spills.
 Decontaminate JBPM personnel that have been exposed to hazardous materials.
 Handling radioactive and radiation-emitting materials.
 Handling fire caused by hazardous materials.
 Handling Chemical, Biological, Radiological, Nuclear Exposure (CBRNe) during wartime.

MUST Team 

Multi-Skill Team (MUST) is an elite airborne team of JBPM. Formed on 11 September 1998, MUST is formed by combining all special trained firefighters into one team and supported by helicopters from JBPM Air Wing. MUST units are usually deployed whenever a certain special unit is unavailable in a certain area or when extra assistance is requested by other special units. MUST primarily serve as helicopter-borne firefighters mainly tasked with rescue involving airborne rappelling insertion.

Although MUST is primarily an elite airborne unit, MUST can conduct support operations to assist other divisions (that are unavailable or requested) such as:
 High Rise Rescue
 Water Rescue
 Major Road and Traffic Accident management
 HAZMAT Operations (Support unit)
 General Search and Rescue (basic) first responder
 Emergency Medical and Rescue (helicopter-borne extraction)
 Jungle Firefighting
 High Angle Rescue
 Air Rescue (rappel insertion)
All MUST members are trained in helicopter-borne, emergency management in aircraft, jungle survival and sea-land navigation.

Elite JBPM Rescue Swimmer Unit is attached to MUST.

RIM 

Rapid Intervention Motorcycle Team (RIM) was formed in 1999 to tackle problems of late arriving rescue caused by traffic jammed in the big city. With superbikes equipped with basic Firefighting and rescue equipment, RIM team can handle small scale fire and Road and Traffic Accident (RTA) without having traffic problems. During bigger scale of fire, RIM team will arrive early and assess the size and type of incident, building, and materials involve and victim if any. RIM team also will help control the traffic for the fire truck movement.

Water Rescue Unit 
Pasukan Penyelamat Dalam Air (PPDA); also known as Water Rescue Unit, their role is to deal with incidents and emergencies that occur in the water. This unit consists of qualified officers and men trained at local and overseas diving training centres. All members of the JBPM Water Rescue Unit are certified divers from the National Association of Underwater Instructors (NAUI).

PASKUB 
Pasukan Khas Udara Bomba (PASKUB) is a command for elite Smokejumper with support of helicopters from JBPM Air Wing.

Smoke Jumpers Unit is an elite unit of JBPM and trained in parachute insertion (static line and freefall), helicopter-borne operation and jungle survival. The formation of elite Smoke Jumper began in 2000 after JBPM sent five firefighters to enter the Basic Static Line Parachuting Course held at Royal Malaysian Air Force (RMAF) Sempang Air Force Base, Sungai Besi as the pioneer team Smoke Jumpers. The course was conducted by RMAF Special Operations Force, PASKAU until 2007 when JBPM established their own Static Ramp Air Course. Among the task of Smoke Jumper is:
 Combat Air Rescue Medic 
 Medical Evacuation (Medevac)
 Deep jungle/Isolated Area Firefighting Operations

Smoke Jumper enjoys good relations with Malaysian Armed Force Special Operations Forces as they always train with RMAF PASKAU, Malaysian Army Grup Gerak Khas from PULPAK and Royal Malaysian Police VAT 69 Commando. PASKUB members are selected from various units including STORM, MUST and EMRS.

EMRS 
Emergency Medical Rescue Services (EMRS) Team was formed in 2006 with cooperation from the Malaysian Ministry of Health and Malaysian Association of Traumatology and Emergency Medicine (MASTEM). EMRS was established as a Special Force Paramedic to rescue and conduct medical care to other JBPM Special Forces members if any incident occurs to them. However, EMRS can rescue and conduct medical care to civilians if there are no other ambulance or paramedics from the Malaysian Ministry of Health or State Health Department around.

Typically, EMRS team is assigned to HAZMAT and Water Rescue unit and EMRS vehicle will go out in pairs with the other JBPM Special Forces vehicle to operations. EMRS members are also usually tasked as paramedics during JBPM Special Forces and Special Operations Forces Selections.

Some EMRS members are trained in HAZMAT and Scuba diving.

K9 Unit 
K9 Management Unit uses trained dogs to operate in the Search and Rescue (SAR) operations and investigation. The K9 Unit can be attached to the regular firefighting unit or JBPM Special Forces thus all dog handlers together with their dogs are trained for a variety of situations, including the urban and jungle operations.

Special Force Boat Team 
A support team task to support JBPM Special Forces with water transportation during operations involving of lake, river and sea. The boat crews are trained in water survival and able to perform water rescue to JBPM personnel and civilians if things go south.

Special Operations Force

STORM 
Special Tactical Operation and Rescue Team of Malaysia (STORM) unit is a part of the Malaysian Rapid Deployment Force together with 10 Parachute Brigade (10 PARA) but with different task and role. Formed in March 2011, STORM winning is a Search and Rescue (SAR) experts and on standby for 24/7 at JBPM Airbases and State Branch Headquarters. Storm unit mainly task with SAR operations involving: 
 Night rescue operations
 Heavy Urban Search and Rescue (Advanced) and Technical Rescue
 Deep-jungle rescue
 Cave rescue
 Air-sea rescue
 Mountain rescue
 Large-scale natural disaster
 Airplane and Helicopter crash
Dubbed as Komando Bomba ( or ), to be selected as STORM members, firefighters need to pass the rigorous selection course which is on par as Basic Commando Course. Eligibility requirements including Individual Physical Proficiency Test (IPPT) standards of physical fitness that is also used by the Singapore Armed Forces (SAF), Singapore Police Force (SPF) and Singapore Civil Defence Force (SCDF) before trainee can even enter the Basic Storm Course. Once pass the Storm Survival Course, the graduate will receive a tactical knife, the same sort used by RMAF PASKAU, STORM patch and permission to wear STORM Red Helmet and STORM Version Camouflage Dress.

Many of STORM members are drawn from Water Rescue Unit (PPDA), EMRS, HAZMAT Unit and MUST.

For big operations, STORM work together with other federal SAR Special Force; Special Malaysia Disaster Assistance and Rescue Team (SMART) which under administration of the National Security Council. They are usually supported by the jungle experts, the aboriginal police unit; Senoi Praaq, Royal Malaysian Police's (RMP) VAT 69 Commando and General Operations Force, Malaysian Armed Force special operations force and Malaysian Civil Defence Force.

Current inventory

Vehicles 

Honda ST 1300 Pan European, VFR 800 – Rapid intervention motorcycles.
Honda 6x6 All-Terrain Vehicle – Off-Road Rescue missions and forest firefighting.
Isuzu Morita Super Gyro Turntable Ladder – 4WD rescue vehicle.
Scania Medium Fire Rescue Tender
Magirus TL30 Turn table ladder.
Scania HAZMAT tender.
Scania Exhibition and Information Vehicle.
Scania P31D Multilift Pod Carriers (Mobile/Modular Command Post, Rescue equipments).
Mercedes-Benz Atego – Light fire rescue tender:
Mercedes-Benz Actros 1831/Amdac-Magirus – Turntable ladder.
 Mercedes-Benz Actros 3335/Amdac-Magirus – Turntable ladder.
 Mercedes-Benz Actros – Pumper/Heavy tanker/Water tender.
Volvo N1227 Numela 30m Skylift HP – Bought in the early 80's, SLEP Programme Upgrades (on 2003), gradually to be phased-out.
GMC C3500 – Rapid intervention fire rescue tender.
Ford F350 XL – Rapid intervention fire rescue tender:
Ford Ranger Everest 4WD Command Vehicle.
Mitsubishi Pajero – (Gradually being replaced with Toyota Hilux) 4WD Fire Commander Vehicle.
DRB-Hicom Handalan 2 – 4WD General purpose 3 tonne truck with rear lift.
Perodua Rusa Utility Van – Gradually being phased out. Replaced with Nissan Urvan Utility Van/MPV, Jinbei Haise Utility Van/MPV.
Kia Pregio – Fire investigation/forensics vehicle.
Scania c/w Trailer – 20,000 litres water tanker.
Toyota Hiace – Emergency medical and rescue services (EMRS) ambulance.
Isuzu D-Max – 4WD utility vehicle.

Sea units
 Kevlar Composite Boat-Rigid Hull Inflatable Boat RHIB.
 Aluminium Boat Light Rescue Boat.
 Jet Ski c/w Rescue Board.
 Inboard Fire Boat.

Air units

 2 x AgustaWestland AW109 (Light utility helicopter) – Search and rescue, aerial surveillance, aerial command and control. (9M-BOA & 9M-BOB) (9M-BOA crashed on 16/9/2010 at near Lanchang, Pahang.)
 
 2 x AgustaWestland AW139 (Medium utility helicopter) – Firefighting, disaster relief, search and rescue, aerial surveillance, aerial command and control. (9M-BOC & 9M-BOD)
 2 x AgustaWestland AW189 (Medium utility helicopter) - Delivered in December 2018.
 4 x Mil Mi-17-1V (Heavy helicopter) – Search and rescue, heavy lift for utility, disaster relief, forest aerial firefighting. (M994-01 (Enggang), M994-02 (Pekaka), M994-03, M994-04)

In popular culture 
 2010: "Da Bomba", a comedy TV series by TV3, about Firefighters, their spouses and the fire station's living quarters Community.
 2016: "Abang Bomba I Love You", a romantic TV series by ASTRO, about a young girl fallen in love with her rescuer; a firefighter.
 2016 & 2020: "Hero", a TV series by RTM, about challenges faced by firefighters. Starring by Sharnaaz Ahmad, Tiz Zaqyah, Faezrul Khan, Rusdi Ramli Season 1) and Season 2 continue by Redza Rosli, Sarah Hildebrand, Aidil Aziz, Riz Amin, Anne Ngasri
Hero: Jangan Bikin Panas a comedy action film direct by Azizi Chunk Adnan and starring by Hisyam Hamid, Bell Ngasri and Mark Adam in 2019

See also

 List of fire departments
 Elite Forces of Malaysia

References

External links
 
 

Fire departments
Federal ministries, departments and agencies of Malaysia
Ministry of Housing and Local Government (Malaysia)